Cue sports at the 2007 Asian Indoor Games was held in Macau East Asian Games Dome, Macau, China from 27 October to 2 November 2007.

Medalists

Men

Women

Medal table

Results

Men

One-cushion singles

English billiards singles

Nine-ball singles

Snooker singles

Snooker team

Women

Eight-ball singles

Nine-ball singles

Snooker singles

References

 
 Official Website

2007 Asian Indoor Games events
Asian Indoor Games
Asian Indoor Games
2007
Asian Indoor Games